Agni is a 2004 Bengali action drama thriller film directed by Swapan Saha and produced by Mukul Sarkar. The film features actors Prosenjit Chatterjee and Rachana Banerjee in the lead roles. Music of the film has been composed by Ashok Bhadra The film was a Superhit at the box office.

Plot
The film is about an honest police officer, Agni (Prosenjit Chatterjee), whom terrorists are trying to murder but end up killing a number of school children in a school bus. The police officers are very worried about the rising crime rate, and they vow to curb their attempts. Agni is given the charge. Agni, while trying to save people from a terrorist attack in a shopping complex, rescues Tina (Neelanjana), who falls in love with him. She later discovers that he is married to Chandrani (Rachana Banerjee) and even has a son Apu (Master Anshu). However, this does not deter her love for him. She keeps on finding ways to go to Agni's house. She also becomes friendly with Apu. One day she takes Apu with her from school without Chandrani's permission. Apu studies in a school owned by Dr. Sayol (Tapas Paul), who does not have a child.
Meanwhile, Agni succeeds in catching members Pamela and Peter of the terrorist gang. During this time, Agni's son is locked up by the principal of his school, who is thought to be kidnapped. Agni tries his best to find his son but fails. The principal then releases Apu, who is then taken care of by Anu. Meanwhile, the political agents come and kidnap Apu murdering Anu. Agni then agrees to release Pamela and Peter in return for his son. He is asked to go to the airport and place a briefcase laden with bombs. He fights with the gangsters and finally rescues his son. At last, the politician is also put behind bars.

Cast
 Prosenjit Chatterjee
 Rachana Banerjee
 Abhishek Chatterjee
 Tapas Paul
 Locket Chatterjee
 Rajesh Sharma
 Nilanjana Sengupta
 Sonali Chowdhury
 Dulal Lahiri
 Bodhisattwa Majumdar

Soundtrack

References

External links
 

2004 films
Bengali-language Indian films
2000s Bengali-language films
Films directed by Swapan Saha
Indian action thriller films
Indian action drama films
Films about terrorism in India
2004 action drama films
2004 action thriller films
Indian police films